David Thomas Smith (born 13 September 1989) is an English former first-class cricketer.

Smith was born at Canterbury in September 1989. He was educated at Dane Court Grammar School, before going up to Oxford Brookes University. While studying at Oxford Brookes he played first-class cricket for Oxford UCCE/MCCU from 2009–11, making three appearances against Glamorgan, Hampshire and Lancashire. He scored 36 runs across his three matches, and took a single wicket with his right-arm medium pace bowling. In addition to playing first-class cricket, Smith also played minor counties cricket for Oxfordshire between 2009–13, making sixteen appearances in the Minor Counties Championship and eleven in the MCCA Knockout Trophy.

References

External links

1989 births
Living people
People from Canterbury
Alumni of Oxford Brookes University
English cricketers
Oxford MCCU cricketers
Oxfordshire cricketers